Kavi Raz (born 1 January 1953) is an Indian-born British actor, writer, director and producer.  Born in Punjab, Raz left India at a young age for the United Kingdom, where he grew up.

Biography
Raz attended university in the San Francisco Bay area. He was a founder and artistic director of the Wandering Players' Theatre Company. The company staged several World and US premieres of plays from India. Western audiences were exposed to the works of Rabindranath Tagore for the first time, in addition to plays like Sakharam Binder and Shakuntala. This was the first professional South Asian theatre company in the USA.

In the mid-1970s, Raz arrived in Hollywood: a career as an actor was unheard of at a time when roles for South Asian actors in Hollywood television shows and films were limited. According to Raz, “People, especially friends and relatives scoffed at the idea of my becoming an actor. They thought it was a passing fancy and would soon be over. But no, I had a dream and take what it may I journeyed on to make my dream a reality.”

He went on to become the first ever South Asian actor to be signed on as a regular in a major TV series, St Elsewhere. He was a cast member for the first two seasons of the medical drama, and after being let go continued to appear on a recurring basis. Raz has also appeared in over 200 plays, TV shows and films, including guest appearances on The A-Team, M*A*S*H and Star Trek: The Next Generation. He co-starred with Joe Odagiri and Chloe Snyder in Atsushi Funahashi's Big River in 2005.

In addition to acting, Raz has had a career as a filmmaker, which began with The Gold Bracelet, a movie about a Sikh man faced with the realities of post-9/11. In 1978, Raz founded the production company K. R. Films Hollywood. Its debut, Lehren - a television weekly variety series for the Asian audience - was shown throughout the United States and Canada. In 1988, K. R. Studios was built in Granada Hills. Housing several buildings including the main studio, it has state-of-the-art equipment for film and television productions, as well as a multi-track recording facility for post production and recording needs. The studio is now home to many award-winning producers, writers and directors engaged in the production of commercials, TV programs, music videos and films.

Filmography

Films

 Suraag (1982) - Hindi Film
 Warning Sign (1985)
 Terror Squad (1988)
 Pet Sematary (1989)
 Big River (2005)
 The Gold Bracelet (2006)
 The Black Prince (2017)

Television
 St Elsewhere (1982–87)
 M*A*S*H (1983)
 The A-Team (1985)
 Star Trek: The Next Generation (1987)
 House MD (2010)

References

External links

http://www.santabanta.com/bollywood/129975/alex-reece-to-play-a-british-spy-in-sarabha--cry-for-freedom/

English male film actors
English male television actors
Indian emigrants to England
1953 births
Living people
British male actors of Indian descent